Ola Fritzner  (26 July 1895 – 11 November 1983) was a Norwegian military officer. He was born in Vennesla. He served as a leading police officer during World War II, while also having contacts to leaders of the Norwegian resistance movement.

He was decorated Knight of the Order of Dannebrog, and of the Order of the Sword.

References

1895 births
1983 deaths
People from Vennesla
20th-century French military personnel
Fatherland League (Norway)
Norwegian Army personnel of World War II
Norwegian police officers
Members of Nasjonal Samling
Prisoners and detainees of Germany
Norwegian prisoners and detainees
Knights of the Order of the Dannebrog
Knights of the Order of the Sword